This is a list of newspapers published in, or for, the Goldfields-Esperance region of Western Australia.

Newspapers published in the goldfields, and the people involved, in the late 1890s and early 1900s during the expansive stage of the goldfields, were of considerable political impact on Western Australian politics.  The seeking of adequate representation of goldfields interests over the coast in the Perth based parliament was a constant issues over the early decades of the newspapers.

Goldfields-Esperance is the biggest region in Western Australia. Its population is just under 60,000. The regions involvement in the mining industry is reflected in a number of its newspapers.

Titles

See also 
 List of newspapers in Western Australia
 Gascoyne newspapers
 Great Southern newspapers
 Kimberley newspapers
 Mid West newspapers
 Pilbara newspapers
 South West newspapers
 Wheatbelt newspapers

References

External links 
 
 
 
 
 
 
 
 
 
 
 
 
 
 
 
 

Lists of newspapers published in Western Australia
Newspapers published in Goldfields-Esperance